In biology, genetic demixing refers to a phenomenon in which an initial mixture of individuals with
two or more distinct genotypes rearranges in the course of time,
giving birth to a spatial organization where some or all genotypes are concentrated in distinct patches.

See also
 Population genetics
 Microbiology
 Genomics
 Ecology
 microbial ecology

References

Microbial population biology
Genetics